Tatyana Grigorievna Gevorkyan (April 20, 1974, Moscow, RSFSR, USSR) is a Russian TV presenter, journalist and actress.

Biography 
She was born on April 20, 1974 in Moscow. Parents engaged in the rental of Soviet cinema abroad, traveled extensively.

She studied at schools in different countries, graduated from school in India.

In her school years she was fond of drawing, dancing, got a brown belt in karate, she collected car models, learned to play guitar [1].

She entered the film science faculty at the correspondence department of VGIK. Entered, lived a year in India in Delhi, where at the Delhi's Jesus and Mary College studied English literature, philosophy and logic. In 2002 she graduated from VGIK.

In 1995, the press attaché for Radio Maximum began to work. Since September 1998, she has conducted the Stilissimo and Style Guide programs on MTV Russia. Together with Anton Komolov, she led the program  Playstation and The  Higher Test. In 2002 to 2004, together with Ivan Urgant, she conducted the evening show  Expresso.

In 2008, she released a collection of footwear under the brand name Tanya Gevorkyan.

From January 2010 to December 2011 she was co-host of the program  Girls  on the channel Russia 1.

From January 2011 to December 2016 she led the program  Culture News  on the channel Russia-K.

Since January 22, 2017   the leader of the second season of the program  In Style  on the channel U, and since January 30 of the same year he also conducts the program  The Business Morning of NTV.

She was a columnist in a number of women's magazines.

References

External links
 Татьяна Геворкян: биография, карьера и личная жизнь
 Татьяна Геворкян. Биография и фильмография

1974 births
Living people
VJs (media personalities)
Mass media people from Moscow
Russian women journalists
Russian television presenters
Gerasimov Institute of Cinematography alumni
Russian film actresses
Russian people of Armenian descent
Russian women television presenters